I Dutifully Report is a 1958 Czechoslovak comedy film directed by Karel Steklý. It is the sequel to The Good Soldier Schweik.

Cast
 Rudolf Hrušínský as Josef Švejk
 Svatopluk Beneš as first lieutenant Lukáš
 Jaroslav Marvan as constable Flanderka
 Miloš Nedbal as general major Von Schwarzburg
 Fanda Mrázek as sergeant
 Jaroslav Vojta as shepherd
 Alois Dvorský as wanderer
 Jana Kovaříková as Pejzlerka
 František Černý as innkeeper
 František Šlégr as Schröder
 Otto Hradecký as Ságner

References

External links
 

1958 films
1958 comedy films
1950s war comedy films
Czechoslovak comedy films
1950s Czech-language films
Films based on works by Jaroslav Hašek
Films directed by Karel Steklý
Czech war comedy films
Czech sequel films
The Good Soldier Švejk
Czech World War I films
1950s Czech films